Petropavlovka is a rural locality (a village) in Nizhnebikkuzinsky Selsoviet, Kugarchinsky District, Bashkortostan, Russia. The population was 4 as of 2010. There is 1 street.

Geography 
Petropavlovka is located 43 km north of Mrakovo (the district's administrative centre) by road. Ishtuganovo is the nearest rural locality.

References 

Rural localities in Kugarchinsky District